Interstate 85 (I-85) is a major Interstate Highway that travels northeast–southwest in the US state of Georgia. It enters the state at the Alabama state line near West Point, and Lanett, Alabama, traveling through the Atlanta metropolitan area and to the South Carolina state line, where it crosses the Savannah River near Lake Hartwell. I-85 connects North Georgia with Montgomery, Alabama, to the southwest, and with South Carolina, North Carolina, and Virginia to the northeast. Within Georgia, I-85 is also designated as the unsigned State Route 403 (SR 403).

I-85 in Georgia usually travels roughly parallel with the route of US Route 29 (US 29). However, from Atlanta northeast to South Carolina, I-85 ventures away from that route, traveling about halfway between US 29 and the combination of US 23 and US 123.

Within the city of Atlanta, I-85 has a concurrency with I-75 known as the "Downtown Connector". After splitting from Downtown Connector, it is known as Northeast Expressway until its junction with I-285 (The Perimeter).

Route description

Alabama state line to I-185

I-85 enters the state of Georgia from Alabama via twin bridges over the Chattahoochee River, and then it immediately skirts the town of West Point, with Kia's multibillion-dollar plant located adjacent to the freeway just east of West Point. After leaving West Point, I-85 enters the LaGrange area, the first large town in Georgia on its route to the northeast. Northeast of LaGrange, I-85 has an interchange with the long spur freeway, I-185, to the Columbus metropolitan area. This is the only connection between Columbus and the Interstate Highway System.

An  stretch between the Alabama line and exit 18 in LaGrange is serving as an environmental and technological testbed for a project called The Ray, a partnership involving federal and state officials, the private sector, academia and philanthropic organizations. Among the projects are a solar-paved roadway, enhanced road striping for autonomous vehicles, and plantings along the right-of-way to improve runoff and possibly serve as a harvestable crop.

From I-185 through Atlanta

From LaGrange, I-85 heads northeastward toward Atlanta. Before reaching Atlanta, the highway crosses the CSX Transportation A&WP Subdivision twice (in the Grantville area) and passes through the suburbs of Moreland, Newnan, Fairburn, and Union City. The highway then intersects I-285 at its southwest end in College Park. This interchange is one of the most complex interchanges in the country, as I-285 and I-85 stay side by side through the interchange, which actually has two parts. The interchange also features many other, not as important local access roads at the same time; meanwhile providing access to Hartsfield–Jackson Atlanta International Airport. I-85 then runs along the northwestern boundary of the airport in East Point, providing access to the domestic terminal.

At the southwestern edge of Atlanta's city limits, I-85 merges with I-75 to form the Downtown Connector, which is 12 to 14 lanes wide. At the southern edge of Downtown Atlanta, this freeway has an interchange with the major east–west Interstate Highway, I-20. The two freeways then skirt the eastern edge of downtown, running due north, passing through the Georgia Tech campus and the Atlantic Station section of Atlanta before the two highways split, with I-75 exits via the right three lanes and then heads northwest while I-85 uses the left three lanes and then heads northeast.

Atlanta to South Carolina state line

Heading northbound after the Brookwood Interchange with I-75, I-85 is routed along a 10-lane-wide viaduct from the Buford Highway Connector (exit 86) to SR 400 (exit 87). Continuing northeast of Atlanta, I-85 continues through the northeastern suburbs, bypassing Chamblee and Doraville, where there is another intersection with I-285 (nicknamed Spaghetti Junction). The Interstate then travels through the northeastern suburbs of Atlanta, including Lilburn, Duluth, Lawrenceville, and Buford. The Interstate has freeway interchanges with SR 316 in Duluth and I-985 in Suwanee, which provides a link to Gainesville. I-85 eventually leaves the Atlanta metropolitan area and narrows down to four lanes (two in each direction) past exit 129 as the highway continues into the rural parts of northeast Georgia. At Lake Hartwell, which was formed by the damming of the Savannah River, I-85 crosses the Savannah River into South Carolina.

Express lanes

I-85 has the first express lanes in Georgia, located in Gwinnett and DeKalb counties; they were originally high-occupancy vehicle lanes (HOV lanes). Though not signed on the freeway, they are high-occupancy toll lanes (HOT lanes), which means registered transport vehicles, carpools with three or more occupants, motorcycles, and busses are exempt from toll charges as long as they are registered as such. Tolls are collected using an electronic toll collection system. All travelers that use the lane must have a Peach Pass sticker to avoid fines. Starting in November 2014, SunPass (Florida) and NC Quick Pass (North Carolina) are interoperable with Peach Pass, allowing motorists with those transponders to use the express lanes.

On November 3, 2018, an extension to the express lanes opened, from its former ending at Old Peachtree Road to Hamilton Mill Road (exit 120). After this extension, four more northbound exit points were added: at SR 317 (exit 111), I-985 (exit 113), SR 20 (exit 115), and at its end at Hamilton Mill Road (exit 120). In addition, four new access points were added to the southbound express lanes: at SR 20, SR 317, Old Peachtree Road, and at the connection to the preexisting express lanes. The project costed $178 million (equivalent to $ in ). The express lanes extension will incur a separate charge from the existing express lanes. This is to decrease the impact of high congestion on the existing express lanes on the dynamic pricing of the express lanes extension, since lower congestion is expected on the new extension of the express lanes.

Funds generated from the express lanes will be used to defray the costs of construction, operations, and maintenance of the lanes. Long-term revenue allocation is being studied and a decision about future excess revenues will be made later in the project process.

Proponents for the express lanes say it is to provide commuters with a more reliable, free-flow commute option; complement the state's multimodal approach to managing traffic demand; and establish the vision for a future system of HOT lanes in the region. Detractors point out that existing infrastructure was reused for the express lanes and that commute times on the nonpaying travel lanes have doubled since implementation.

History

Originally constructed as a four- to six-lane expressway in the 1950s, the stretch of I-85 between the southern merge with I-75 and North Druid Hills Road was reconstructed as part of the Georgia Department of Transportation (GDOT)'s Freeing the Freeways program. This project included rebuilding all overpasses, new HOV-ready ramps (with the system implemented in 1996), and a widening of freeway capacity. Concurrent with this project was the construction of the Civic Center station as part of the West Peachtree Street overpass, which opened in December 1981.

The  section between LaGrange and Newnan was incomplete for a much-longer time that the rest of I-85 in Georgia and required a two-lane detour on US 27 and US 29 between those cities. The northern section between Newnan and Grantville was completed first, then the stretch further south to LaGrange was completed in 1977.

The portion of the highway from the Buford Highway Connector to SR 400 was constructed during the early 1980s and was designed as a replacement for the original four-lane routing of I-85 (now SR 13). In addition, the new viaduct was designed to accommodate connections to the SR 400 tollway (then in planning), HOV lanes, and a bridge carrying the North Line (then under construction, now the Red Line).

Until 2000, the state of Georgia used the sequential exit numbering system on all of its Interstate Highways. The first exit on each highway would begin with the number 1 and increase numerically with each exit. In 2000, GDOT switched to a mileage-based exit system, in which the exit number corresponded to the nearest milepost.

On October 1, 2011, GDOT converted the  HOV lanes in northern Atlanta into express/HOT lanes.

From Atlanta, I-85 north was originally slated to be built through the city of Athens to provide an easy link between the capital city and the University of Georgia. However, then-Governor Ernest Vandiver worked to make sure the highway traversed his home county of Franklin, a stretch that now bears his name. At the time, he promised equivalent access for Athens and Gainesville. It was not until the completion of SR 316 in the 1990s that there was finally a relatively quick, multilane expressway connecting Athens and Atlanta, (US 78 is also multilane between Athens and Atlanta but it is not expressway-grade) although SR 316 still is largely at-grade.

On March 30, 2017, a fire started at approximately 6:15 pm in a storage area under the highway along Piedmont Road in the Piedmont Heights area of Midtown Atlanta. This caused the collapse of a  section of I-85 northbound. The highway in both directions needed to be demolished and replaced. According to GDOT, the work was completed ahead of schedule. Both the north and south bound portions of the Interstate were open by May 15, 2017, a month ahead of expectations.

Future 
In May 2017, the Gwinnett County Board of Commissioners voted to accept about $6 million (equivalent to $ in ) in federal funds, to be used to acquire land to build a new diamond interchange on I-85 at SR 324/Gravel Springs Road. The new exit will be located between exit 115, for SR 20, and exit 120, for Hamilton Mill Road/Hamilton Mill Parkway. The board voted in July 2019 to accept about $20 million (equivalent to $ in ) in federal and state grants to pay for the construction of the new interchange. E.R. Snell Contractors will complete the work. Since an overpass already exists for SR 324, on- and offramps, I-85 deceleration lanes, traffic signals, and turn lanes are the main aspects of the interchange to be added. The main goal for the new interchange is to provide another access point from I-85 to Mall of Georgia. Construction of the interchange is expected to start in late 2018 and will be completed in about 18 months.

Exit list

Auxiliary routes
There are three auxiliary Interstate Highways of I-85 within Georgia and a fourth that was proposed, and then cancelled. I-185 is a spur from LaGrange to Columbus. It mainly provides a freeway between the Columbus and Atlanta metropolitan areas. I-285 is a heavily traveled beltway around Atlanta, which helps I-75 and I-85 drivers to bypass the city. I-485 was a short freeway in Atlanta (now Freedom Parkway) that was incomplete for many years and then decommissioned due to local opposition. I-985 is a spur from I-85 to Gainesville.

See also

References

External links

85
 Georgia
Transportation in Harris County, Georgia
Transportation in Troup County, Georgia
Transportation in Meriwether County, Georgia
Transportation in Coweta County, Georgia
Transportation in Fulton County, Georgia
Roads in Atlanta
Transportation in Clayton County, Georgia
Transportation in DeKalb County, Georgia
Transportation in Gwinnett County, Georgia
Transportation in Barrow County, Georgia
Transportation in Jackson County, Georgia
Transportation in Banks County, Georgia
Transportation in Franklin County, Georgia
Transportation in Hart County, Georgia
High-occupancy toll roads